Tim Lang (born 26 March 1981) is an Australian former cricketer. He played first-class and List A cricket for South Australia in 2010/11 and Twenty20 cricket for New South Wales in 2006/07.

See also
 List of New South Wales representative cricketers

References

External links
 

1981 births
Living people
Australian cricketers
New South Wales cricketers
South Australia cricketers
People from Mudgee
Cricketers from New South Wales